Big Timber is a 1950 American action film directed by Jean Yarbrough and written by Warren Wilson. The film stars Roddy McDowall, Jeff Donnell, Lyn Thomas, Gordon Jones, Tom Greenway, Robert Shayne, Ted Hecht and Lyle Talbot. The film was released on September 10, 1950, by Monogram Pictures.

Plot

Cast          
Roddy McDowall as Jimmy
Jeff Donnell as Sally
Lyn Thomas as June
Gordon Jones as Jocko
Tom Greenway as Rocky
Robert Shayne as Dixon
Ted Hecht as Bert
Lyle Talbot as Logger #1

References

External links
 

1950 films
American action adventure films
American action drama films
1950s action adventure films
1950s action drama films
Monogram Pictures films
Films directed by Jean Yarbrough
1950 drama films
American black-and-white films
Films about lumberjacks
1950s English-language films
1950s American films